Asplenium auritum, the eared spleenwort, is a species of fern native to the Neotropical Realm of the American Continent (from the Florida Peninsula to southern Brazil and northern Argentina) and Eastern Southern Africa (from DR Congo to Madagascar and the Mascarene Islands). Its presence is also recorded in the Azores where it might possibly be native.

References

auritum
Ferns of the Americas
Ferns of Africa
Flora of the Azores